Traian Ivănescu (5 May 1933 – 29 July 2019) was a Romanian football player and manager.

Career
Born in Bucharest, Ivănescu played youth football with Militari București and Flamura Roşie București, before making his senior debut in 1951 with Flacăra București. He later played for CCA Steaua București, Progresul București, Siderurgistul Galați and Jiul Petroşani, before retiring in 1966. He was married to Doina Ivănescu a former volleyball player who represented her country at the 1964 Summer Olympics.

He also earned one cap for Romania in 1954.

Ivănescu later became a coach.

He died on 29 July 2019, aged 86.

Honours

Player
Steaua București 
Divizia A (5): 1952, 1953, 1956, 1959–60, 1960–61
Cupa României (3): 1952, 1955, 1961–62

Siderurgistul Galați
Romanian Second Division (1): 1964–65

Jiul Petroșani
Romanian Second Division (1): 1965–66

Manager
Jiul Petroșani
Cupa României (1): 1973–74

Flacăra Moreni
Romanian Second Division (1): 1985–86

References

External links

1933 births
2019 deaths
Romanian footballers
Romania international footballers
Liga I players
Liga II players
FC Petrolul Ploiești players
FC Steaua București players
FC Progresul București players
CSM Jiul Petroșani players
Romanian football managers
CSM Jiul Petroșani managers
FC Brașov (1936) managers
CS Minaur Baia Mare (football) managers
ASC Oțelul Galați managers
CSM Flacăra Moreni managers
CSM Deva managers
Association football defenders